is an interchange railway station located in the city of Kokubunji, Tokyo, Japan, operated by East Japan Railway Company (JR East) and private railway operator Seibu Railway.

Lines
Kokubunji Station is served by the Chūō Line (Rapid) and is 31.4 kilometers from the terminus of the line at Tokyo. It also forms a terminus for both the Seibu Kokubunji and Seibu Tamako Lines.

Station layout
The JR East side of the station consists of two island platforms serving four tracks. The station has a "Midori no Madoguchi" staffed ticket office. The Seibu portion of the station has one side of a former island platform (Platform 5) parallel to and north of the JR platforms. Platform 6 is now closed. Platform 7 is further north again but is above and perpendicular to the other platforms.

JR East

JR Platforms

Seibu Railway

Seibu Platforms

History

What is now the JR East station opened on 11 April 1889. The Seibu Kokubunji Line platforms opened on 21 December 1894, and the Tamako Railway (present-day Seibu Tamako Line) platforms opened on 6 April 1928.

Station numbering was introduced on all Seibu Railway lines during fiscal 2012, with Kokubunji Station becoming "SK01" on the Seibu Kokubunji Line and "ST01" on the Seibu Tamako Line.

Passenger statistics
In fiscal 2019, the station was used by an average of 112,090 passengers daily (boarding passengers only), making it the 31st busiest in the JR East network. The Seibu station was used by an average of 117,796 passengers daily making it the sixth busiest station served by Seibu.
The passenger figures for previous years are as shown below. Note that JR East figures consider only boarding passengers whereas Seibu figures consider both entering and exiting passengers.

Surrounding area

North side
 Tokyo Gakugei University
 Bunka Gakuen University

South side
 Tonogayato Garden
 Hotel Mets Kokubunji
 Tokyo Keizai University
 Tokyo University of Agriculture and Technology

See also

 List of railway stations in Japan

References

External links

 Kokubunji Station information (JR East) 
 Station information (Seibu) 

Railway stations in Japan opened in 1894
Chūō Main Line
Stations of East Japan Railway Company
Stations of Seibu Railway
Seibu Kokubunji Line
Seibu Tamako Line
Railway stations in Tokyo
Railway stations in Japan opened in 1889
Kokubunji, Tokyo